The 135th Illinois Infantry Regiment was an infantry regiment from Illinois that served in the Union Army between June 6 and September 28, 1864, during the American Civil War.

Service 
The regiment was organized at Mattoon, Illinois, with a strength of 852 men, and mustered in for one-hundred-day service on June 6, 1864. On June 10, the regiment departed for Benton Barracks, Missouri, where they reported to General William Rosecrans.

From there five companies of the regiment were stationed on the Iron Mountain railroad. Three companies of the regiment were stationed at the Gasconade railroad crossing and a further two companies stationed at the Osage railroad crossing of the Missouri Pacific Railroad and at Jefferson City, Missouri. The regiment was mustered out on September 28, 1864. During its service the regiment lost one man at Gasconade crossing and sixteen men to disease.

See also
List of Illinois Civil War Units

Notes

References

Bibliography 
 Dyer, Frederick H. (1959). A Compendium of the War of the Rebellion. New York and London. Thomas Yoseloff, Publisher. .
 Reece. Brigadier General J.N. (1900). The Report of Illinois from Military and Naval Department of the Adjutant General of the State of Illinois. Containing Reports for the Years 1861–1866. Springfield, Illinois. Journal Company, Printers and Binders.

Units and formations of the Union Army from Illinois
1864 establishments in Illinois
Military units and formations established in 1864
Military units and formations disestablished in 1864